PDFCreator is an application for converting documents into Portable Document Format (PDF) format on Microsoft Windows operating systems. It works by creating a virtual printer that prints to PDF files, and thereby allows practically any application to create PDF files by choosing to print from within the application and then printing to the PDFCreator printer.

In addition to PDFCreator Free, there are three business editions with additional features: PDFCreator Professional, PDFCreator Server and PDFCreator Terminal Server.

Since 2009, PDFCreator has included closed source adware, toolbars and other software that is installed by default.

Implementation
The application is written in Microsoft C# and released to the public at no charge. It works with 64-bit and 32-bit Windows versions including Windows 11. The actual PDF generation is handled by Ghostscript, which is included in the setup packages.

Besides being installed as a virtual printer, PDFCreator can be associated with .ps files to manually convert PostScript to PDF format.

PDFCreator can convert to the following file formats: PDF (including PDF/A (PDF/A-1b, PDF/A-2b and PDF/A-3b) and PDF/X (X-3:2002, X-3:2003 and X-4)), PNG, JPEG, TIFF, TXT. It also allows to digitally sign PDF documents.

PDFCreator allows any COM enabled application to make use of its functionality. The business editions of PDFCreator allow users to write their own C# scripts with access to the entire job data. These custom scripts can be integrated directly before and after the conversion. They have full access to the .NET-framework and can reference compatible external libraries.

PDFCreator allows the user to disable printing, copying of text or images and modifying the original document. The user can also choose between two types of passwords, user and owner, to restrict PDF files in several ways. The former is required to open the PDF file, while the latter is necessary in order to change permissions and password. Encryption can be either Low (128 Bit), Medium (128 Bit AES) or High (256 Bit AES), with the latter only being available in the PDFCreator Business editions. 

PDFCreator provides the possibility for automating certain tasks, for example with the help of user tokens. These placeholders for values, like today’s date, username, or e-mail address can be helpful when printing many similar files like invoices.

With PDFCreator users can verify their authorship of a document with digital signatures. This feature is part of all PDFCreator editions, including PDFCreator Free.

Starting with version 0.9.6, there is full support for Windows Vista and version 0.9.7 provides support for Windows 7.

Starting with version 3.0.0, PDFCreator ended support for Windows XP.

Starting with version 4.4.0 there is full support for Windows 11.

Editions 
PDFCreator is open source and freeware. The code can be downloaded and modified.

In addition to PDFCreator Free there are three commercial editions. All of them allow administrators to predefine specific settings centrally with the easy management of user groups.

PDFCreator ProfessionalThis version can be installed silently in Windows domains, which is not possible in PDFCreator Free.
PDFCreator Terminal Server It has been developed for the use on Windows Servers with installed Remote Desktop Service and on Citrix Servers. Print jobs can be assigned securly to separate user sessions. Only one license key is needed per terminal server and it is valid for an ulimited number of users.
PDFCreator Server This works as Windows service application. It allows the central management of settings and users for administrator. Additionally, it lets the user share PDFCreator printers in their network, auto-convert without user interaction and it offers high performance through multi-threading.

Adware toolbar controversy
Between 2009 and 2013 the installation package included a closed-source browser toolbar that was considered by many users to be malicious software. Although technically an optional component, the opt-out procedure used to be a two-step process (prior to version 1.2.3), which was considered by many to be intentionally confusing. In addition to the spyware activity described below, the toolbar allowed one-click creation of PDFs from the current webpage and included a search tool. As of version 1.2.3, the opt-out procedure only required unchecking one checkbox during the installation process.

Starting with version 0.9.7 (February 2009), PDFCreator included an adware toolbar. The end-user-license agreement for PDFForge Toolbar by Spigot, Inc. (versions prior to 0.9.7 have a different, optional toolbar called "PDFCreator Toolbar"), states that the software will:

Pdfforge, which created PDFCreator, wrote an FAQ entry regarding the toolbar that stated:

Since that time various versions of PDFCreator have included adware toolbars and other software with the installer, which many virus scanners identify as problematic or undesired software.

In March 2012 the company announced that the toolbar had been discontinued with version 1.3.0.  The company stated:

As of 23 March 2012, PDFCreator included the MyStart toolbar by Incredibar. On 13 June 2012, PDFCreator once again included another controversial bundled software package, which tests as spyware, called SweetIM. In July 2012 the project disabled reviews and ratings on its sourceforge repository.

On 30 August 2012, PDFCreator version 1.5.0 was released which included an installer for the "AVG Security Toolbar."  There was an option to disable installation of the "AVG Security Toolbar, but it was not clearly identified.  Furthermore, installation of PDFCreator required acceptance of the AVG EULA even when installation of the "AVG Security Toolbar" was disabled.

On 23 October 2012, PDFCreator version 1.5.1 was released  which includes an installer for iClaro Search. Compared to previous adware choices, once installed, iClaro cannot be removed using the "Add/Remove Programs" option.

On 14 January 2013, PDFCreator version 1.6.2 was released which includes an installer for Install Entrusted Toolbar. The setup screen for Install Entrusted Toolbar has a single option in black font. The description for Express (recommended) reads:

In October 2013, PDFCreator was stealthily installing more software, including Amazon's Internet Explorer toolbar, without notifying the user.

Awards
The now defunct OpenCD project chose PDFCreator as the best free software package for creating PDF files in Windows.

In August 2008, InfoWorld magazine recognized PDFCreator with an Open Source Software Award from the field of more than 50 available open source or free PDF creation applications.

Both of these awards predate the inclusion of the contested spyware.

See also 
 List of PDF software
 List of virtual printer software

References

External links
 
 

Adware
PDF software
Windows-only freeware
Software that bundles malware